George Handford (1582–5 – 1647), was an English Baroque composer.

He spent some time in Cambridge, and may have been a pensioner at Emmanuel College, Cambridge in 1604, or a fellow of Trinity College, Cambridge. He married twice, at St.-Dunstan-in-the-West Church, Cambridge.

He published Ayres to be sung to the lute, written in 1609, which is 'unique in that it is the only collection of lute songs that is a carefully prepared work by one man...and not simply an anthology of somebody's favourite songs'.

References

1580s births
1647 deaths
17th-century classical composers
17th-century English composers